The Man with a Cloak is a 1951 American film noir crime-thriller-drama directed by Fletcher Markle and starring Joseph Cotten, Barbara Stanwyck, Louis Calhern, and Leslie Caron, and based on "The Gentleman from Paris", a short story by John Dickson Carr.

Plot
A young French woman, Madeline Minot, arrives in New York in 1848, looking for expatriate Charles Thevenet. She is initially turned away at the door by his mistress and housekeeper, Lorna Bounty, but persists, presenting Charles with a letter of introduction from his only grandson, Paul, a romantic revolutionary with whom Madeline is in love.

Charles is an old, wealthy, and dissipated rake, who correctly guesses Madeline's purpose in visiting him: she has been sent by Paul to ask him for money to support the revolution in France. Assisted by hulking butler, Martin, and cook Mrs. Flynn, who are also after Charles' fortune, having waited for the old man to die for ten years, Lorna lets Charles drink as much as he wants, contrary to the instructions of Dr. Roland, and replaces some prescribed medicine.

Madeline has one ally, a chance acquaintance named Dupin, a heavy-drinking impecunious poet, to whom she turns when she suspects that Charles' medicine has been laced with poison. They take a sample to a pharmacist, who determines that it is sugar water. Dupin becomes acquainted with Lorna, and recognizes her as a former actress who achieved fame with Charles' backing.

During her stay at Charles' residence, Madeline softens the old reprobate's heart. He summons his lawyer, Durand, and changes his will. Then he secretly puts arsenic in his drink, ready to end his life. However, he suffers a stroke that paralyzes him, leaving him only partial control of his face. He watches helplessly as Durand drinks the fatal brandy. The will is then snatched up by Charles' pet raven and hidden in the fireplace. Before the old man dies, he tries to pass along to Dupin the location of the will solely with his eyes.

Lorna guesses that there is a new will and its contents. After the funeral, she and her accomplices search desperately for it without success. Dupin is more perceptive; from the clues, he finds and retrieves the document, though he has to fight Martin off to escape the house alive. When the will is read, it reveals that Paul does inherit the money; Lorna, Martin and Mrs. Flynn are left only the house.

At the end of the film, Madeline goes looking for Dupin to thank him. Dupin's generous bartender, Flaherty, tells her he has gone, leaving only a seemingly worthless IOU for his sizable bar bill. On one side is a draft of a verse about a woman named Annabel Lee, and on the other, the IOU's signature, which reveals Dupin's real name: Edgar Allan Poe.

Cast

 Joseph Cotten as Dupin, a pseudonym for Edgar Allan Poe
 Barbara Stanwyck as Lorna Bounty
 Louis Calhern as Thevenet
 Leslie Caron as Madeline Minot
 Joe De Santis as Martin
 Jim Backus as Flaherty
 Margaret Wycherly as Mrs. Flynn
 Richard Hale as Durand
 Nicholas Joy as Dr. Roland
 Roy Roberts as Policeman
 Mitchell Lewis as Waiter

Casting
Markle originally wanted Marlene Dietrich for the role of the scheming mistress and Lionel Barrymore for the ailing millionaire, but Barrymore was too ill and when Marlene said no, Stanwyck jumped in. During filming, Stanwyck was going through a difficult divorce with actor husband Robert Taylor.

Music
The dramatic score for the film was composed and conducted by David Raksin.  In his score, he wrote for an uncommon ensemble of instruments - 2 flutes, 1 oboe, 2 clarinets, 1 bass clarinet, 1 bassoon; 1 horn, 1 trumpet, 1 trombone; 1 percussion, and a solo viola d’amore - and included a musical clue to the identity of Dupin.  He also employed a tone row in the main title theme, claimed to be the first used in film.

"Another Yesterday", the song performed onscreen by Barbara Stanwyck, was written by Earl K. Brent and dubbed by vocalist Harriet Lee.

The complete score by Raksin was issued on cd in 2009, on Film Score Monthly records.

Cinematic clues as to Dupin's real identity
The film opens by challenging viewers with the puzzle raised by the following text:“In the lives of all men there are moments of mystery—for man often yearns, and sometimes chooses, to wander alone and nameless. This is the tale of such a wanderer, once little known and less respected, whose real name later became immortal.”TCM'S Charles Sterritt comments on the revelation of Dupin as Edgar Alan Poe in the last shot of the film: “If you haven't guessed it a few reels before that, you weren't paying much attention in junior high.” Clues throughout the picture include:

He affects a style of dress famously worn by Poe.
He recites pieces of Poe's verse, including an excerpt from The Raven.
He has a talent for solving mysteries.
He uses the name of Poe's famous detective.  
He drinks constantly, running up a large bar bill which he cannot pay.
A pet raven plays a key role in the story.

The TCM site adds the observation that although the film suggests that Poe's name would have meant nothing to the other characters in 1848, he was already well known.  C. Auguste Dupin appeared in  "The Murders in the Rue Morgue" (1841),  "The Mystery of Marie Rogêt" (1842) and "The Purloined Letter" (1844). Poe's poem “The Raven” brought him huge popular success when it was published in 1845.

Reception
According to MGM records the film earned $441,000 in the US and Canada and $322,000 elsewhere, resulting in a loss of $455,000.

References

External links

 The Man with a Cloak at the Film Score Monthly
 
 
 

1951 films
1950s historical films
American black-and-white films
1950s mystery drama films
Films based on short fiction
Films set in 1848
American historical films
American mystery drama films
Metro-Goldwyn-Mayer films
Films set in New York City
Films scored by David Raksin
Cultural depictions of Edgar Allan Poe
1951 drama films
Biographical films about writers
1950s English-language films
Films directed by Fletcher Markle
1950s American films